Fecenia is a genus of cribellate araneomorph spiders in the family Psechridae, and was first described by Eugène Louis Simon in 1887.

Species
 it contains four species, found only in Asia and Queensland:
Fecenia cylindrata Thorell, 1895 – China, Myanmar, Thailand, Laos
Fecenia macilenta (Simon, 1885) – Malaysia, Indonesia (Sumatra)
Fecenia ochracea (Doleschall, 1859) (type) – Philippines to Australia (Queensland)
Fecenia protensa Thorell, 1891 – India (mainland, Nicobar Is.), Sri Lanka, Thailand, Vietnam, Malaysia, Singapore, Brunei, Indonesia (Sumatra, Borneo, Bali)

See also
 List of Psechridae species

References

Araneomorphae genera
Psechridae
Spiders of Asia
Spiders of Australia